James David Bales (November 5, 1915 in Tacoma, Washington - August 16, 1995 in Searcy, Arkansas) was an influential Bible professor, controversialist and administrator at Harding University (then Harding College) for almost forty years.

Early life and education 

He was born in Tacoma, Washington, but soon moved to Albany, Georgia. He was eleven when his parents were both killed by a train. He then lived with his grandparents in Fitzgerald, Georgia and attended the Woodward Academy, where he was a wrestler. In 1932, he went to Georgia Tech High School, graduating in 1933. He received his bachelor of arts degree at Harding College, where he was also a state wrestling champion in 1936, and received a master's degree at George Peabody college, followed by a doctorate in theological studies at the University of California at Berkley.

Later life and work

He was widely known for his conservative viewpoints, both in religious matters and in politics through his work with the college's American Studies Institute and an adjacent institute, the National Education Program. Working closely with the founder of the National Education Program (NEP), Harding President and nationally known conservative activist George S. Benson, Bales played a leading role in establishing Harding, through the work of the National Education Program and School of American Studies, as a nationally known center for conservative activism.  He published, among other works, The Martin Luther King Story: a Study in Apostasy, Agitation, and Anarchy, which attacks King as a radical and a communist.

A defender and author for conservative causes, Bales acquired an almost legendary reputation among those who had dealings with him at Harding and elsewhere in the Churches of Christ, among both supporters and opponents. One  opponent, Don Haymes, concisely if ironically summarized a widespread view of Bales in a 1977 essay which represented the views of a faction within the Churches of Christ opposed to the strong political and theological conservatism Bales, Benson, and the School of American Studies represented.

Though some of Haymes commentary is incorrect (Baker Book House published at least four of Bales' books), Haymes here and in later remarks seems to touch on the salient aspects for which Bales is most remembered. His personal likability and sincerity were almost universally admired, even by his bitterest enemies. His intellectual honesty is demonstrated in that did not always espouse conservative issues simply because they were conservative issues. He did not hold to positions simply because they were popular. As the result of events and changing times, his views sometimes became objects of controversy and strong disagreement, from both within and without the Churches of Christ.

Bales is tightly linked to George S. Benson and the National Education Program at Harding. Much of his work and advocating for Benson and the NEP, as discussed in Sometimes in the Wrong But Never in Doubt. The influence of the NEP long colored perceptions of Bales and Harding College. A controversy involving Bales' influence at Harding, a dispute between Bales and a Harding Professor named James Atteberry, is also covered in Hicks' book. Ostensibly a dispute over the theological soundness of a private paper delivered by Atteberry at a Harding faculty meeting, the dispute seemed to involve dissenting faculty and student opinions regarding the overall zeitgeist of the NEP and political, cultural, and religious conservatism at Harding in general. In addition, his stance on racial segregation has garnered some criticism. In 1957, when 85% of the students and over 100 faculty members signed a paper stating that they would accept integration at Harding, Benson enlisted Bales to ameliorate their concerns. Bales expounded that segregation should be viewed as a local  tradition that should be respected. He stated his belief that no matter what their station in life, God accepted all people. However, in the New Testament, the church did not dismantle social hierarchies, and that acts that were offensive to some church members (as in the eating of meat sacrificed to idols) were avoided so as not to offend them. Bales said that desegregation should be viewed the same way.

Bales believed that integration was rightful in the long run, but his defensiveness of American government and institutions led him to favor putting such changes off until some time in the distant future.

A consensus about Bales' overall legacy remains unclear, but it appears there has been a rapid decline of Bales legacy and presence upon his retirement and death, as suggested by Haymes' conclusion that "His influence in the Harding sphere ran broad and deep, but it has not, I think, run long." On analysis, the legacy of James D. Bales may perhaps be more strongly seen, if indirectly, in the movement which Hicks and a number of conservative commentators credit the NEP, the quiet but definitive influencing of the formation of the Christian Right.

Notes

External links 
Bales Family History Pages
James D. Bales Project
Restoration History - James D. Bales
 Gospel Light Publishers (two of Bales books still for sale)

1915 births
1995 deaths
American Disciples of Christ
American members of the Churches of Christ
Harding University alumni
Ministers of the Churches of Christ
New Right (United States)
People from Searcy, Arkansas
People from Tacoma, Washington
American anti-communists
 People from Albany, Georgia
Peabody College alumni
American male sport wrestlers
Harding Bisons athletes